El Greco was a Cretan-born painter, sculptor and architect of the Spanish Renaissance. El Greco left his birthplace for Venice in 1567, never to return. El Greco's three years in Venice profoundly influenced his style. In 1577, he emigrated to Toledo, Spain, where he lived and worked until the end of his life.

El Greco's oeuvre is thus divided in three main periods:

 Works he painted while he was still in Crete
 Works he painted while he was still in Venice and Rome
 Works he painted while he was still in Toledo

El Greco was mainly a painter but a few sculptures, including Epimetheus and Pandora, have also been attributed to El Greco. This doubtful attribution is based on the testimony of Pacheco. Pacheco saw in El Greco's studio a series of figurines (of wax, stucco, and wood), but these may have been merely models, like those used in the Italian workshops (like the one El Greco himself had created, when he was in Italy). The figures illustrated recall certain nudes in paintings by El Greco in their elongated proportions, but their naturalism and the accentuated musculature of the male figure are regarded by certain researchers as surprising for El Greco. Among the surviving works of the master are also four drawings; three of them are preparatory works for the altarpiece of Santo Domingo el Antiguo and the fourth one is a study for one of his paintings, The Crucifixion.

List of selected works 
At the time of his death his belonging included 115 paintings, 15 sketches and 150 drawings. In 1908 Manuel B. Cossio, who regarded El Greco's style as a response to Spanish mysticism, published the first comprehensive catalogue of El Greco's works. In 1937 a highly influential study by art historian Rodolfo Pallucchini had the effect of greatly increasing the publicly accepted works of El Greco. Palluchini attributed to El Greco a small triptych in the Galleria Estense at Modena on the basis of a signature on the painting on the back of the central panel on the Modena triptych. There was consensus that the triptych was indeed an early work of El Greco and, therefore, Pallucchini's publication became the yardstick for attributions to the artist. As a result, about 119 disputed compositions (including 19 "signed") were attributed to El Greco. Nevertheless, this "over-production" of El Greco's works created a reaction by other scholars. Wethey denied that the Modena triptych had any connection at all with the artist and produced a reactive catalogue raisonné with a greatly reduced corpus of materials in 1962. Whereas art historian José Camón Aznar had attributed between 787 and 829 paintings to the Cretan master, Wethey reduced the number to 285 authentic works and Halldor Sœhner, a German researcher of Spanish art, recognized only 137. Both Wethey and Sœhner divided in their catalogues the works in those painted by El Greco and those produced by his workshop.

Since 1962 the discovery of the Dormition and the extensive archival research has gradually convinced scholarship that Wethey's assessments were not undisputed, and that his catalogue decisions may have distorted the whole nature of El Greco's origins, development and oeuvre. The discovery of the Dormition led to the attributions of other three signed works of "Doménicos" to El Greco (Modena Triptych, St. Luke Painting the Virgin and Child and The Adoration of the Magi) and then to the acceptance as authentic of more works, some signed, some not, which were brought into the group of early works of El Greco. In 2006 another disputed work, The Passion of Christ — Pietà with Angels, has been finally attributed to El Greco. The painting had been photographed just before the signature was removed; Nano Chatzidakis, curator of the British Library exhibition and Professor of Byzantine Art and Archaeology at the University of Ioannina, unearthed the restorer's photograph.

Nowadays the number of El Greco's works is estimated at about 500. Nevertheless, certain disputes over the exact number of El Greco's authentic works remain unresolved, and the status of Wethey's (still highly esteemed) catalogue is at the centre of these disagreements.  Quantitatively, the disagreements are mostly concerned with the end rather than the beginning of his career.  It is clear his son continued to sell "El Grecos" for many years after the artists death, and in his later years he had a large workshop who, as with other important artists of the period, produced repetitions of many of his compositions.  The identification of these, and deciding how much involvement the master had, if any, in each case, remains unsettled.

These are some of El Greco's most important paintings:

Cretan period (b. 1567)

Italian period (1567–1577)

early 1570s Lamentation

Spanish period (1577–1614)

 c. 1582–1586 Saint Mary Magdalene
 c. 1585–1588 Portrait of Rodrigo de la Fuente
 c. 1590–1595 Agony in the Garden - several versions, the one in Toledo, Ohio being accepted as prime.
 c. 1597–1599 Madonna and the Child with Saint Martina and Saint Agnes
 c. 1600–1605 The Repentant St. Peter, Phillips Collection
 c. 1600–1610 Saint Jerome as Cardinal – five versions, those in the Frick and Metropolitan being generally accepted as prime. Also Madrid, London.
 c. 1603–1605 Coronation of the Virgin, Royal Monastery of Guadalupe (Spain).
 c. 1607 Saint Mary Magdalene

See also
 Museum of El Greco

References

External links

 Fondo para un caballero Greco's Nobleman with his Hand on his Chest underwent an in-depth restoration in 1996 which removed the painting's dark background and radically altered its appearance.
 El Greco's Works

Lists of works of art